Athrips amoenella is a moth of the family Gelechiidae. It is found in Finland, Sweden, France, Spain, Austria, Switzerland, Italy, Slovakia, Hungary, Greece, Ukraine and Russia, as well as on Corsica. Outside of Europe, it is found in Turkey, Kazakhstan and Kyrgyzstan.

The wingspan is 9–11 mm. The forewings are orange with two broad black spots at the costal and posterior margins. The apical area is black and the subapical fascia is yellowish white. There is a small black spot at about one-third near the costa and another dark spot at two-thirds near the posterior margin. The hindwings are grey. Adults are on wing from May to July. The ground colour of the forewings is whitish-yellow with ochreous brown and dark grey markings. The hindwings are dark grey.

The larvae possibly feed on Vicia cracca.

References

Moths described in 1882
Athrips
Moths of Europe
Moths of Asia